Daniel Michel (born 18 August 1995) is an Australian boccia player. He represented Australia at the 2016 Rio Paralympics and  2020 Tokyo Paralympics. He won the bronze medal in the Mixed B3 at the Tokyo Paralympics.

Early life
Michel was born on 18 August 1995 in the eastern Sydney suburb of Maroubra, New South Wales, before his family relocated to the Sutherland Shire in the early 2000s. His mother is of Dutch origin, having been born in The Netherlands and immigrating to Australia in the early 1990s, whilst his father is Australian. He was born with spinal muscular atrophy which means he has minimal movement and strength throughout his body. Daniel attended Heathcote High School and graduated in 2013.

Boccia
Michel was introduced to boccia as a 15 year old through a Muscular Dystrophy NSW camp. He is classified as a BC3 athlete. He came third in his first junior titles and this gave him the encouragement to increase his training. This led to him winning the junior title at his second attempt. Michel was then selected in an Australian Paralympic Committee Paralympic Preparation Program for the Rio Games. His first international competition was at the 2013 Asia and Oceania Championships where he finished fifth and attained a world ranking of 35. At the 2014 World Championships in Beijing, China, he finished 36th. He finished sixth at the 2016 Boccia Individual World Championships. In 2016, he was a New South Wales Institute of Sport scholarship holder and is coached by Australian head coach Ken Halliday. He was selected to represent Australia at the 2016 Rio Paralympics, becoming the first Australian player selected to compete at the Paralympics since 2000.

Michel on his Rio Paralympics selection stated" 

At the Rio Games, Michel won his first pool match in the Mixed individual BC3 but lost his second and did not advance.

Michel won the bronze medal in the Individual BC3 at the 2018 World Championships, Liverpool, England. He teamed with Spencer Cotie and Cal Simpson to win the silver medal in Mixed Pairs BC3.

As of February 2020, Michel is a 4 × World Open champion and has a world ranking of 4.

At the 2020 Tokyo Paralympics, Michel won two of his three Pool Matches and qualified for the Quarterfinals. Here he beat Hansoo Kim of Korea 8–0. In the semifinals he lost to Adam Peska of the Czech Republic 3–4. Michel went on to beat Scott McCowan of Great Britain 6–1 in the bronze medal playoff. By doing so, Michel won Australia's first individual medal for boccia by winning the bronze medal in the Mixed BC3. Australia's previous boccia medal was in the Pairs C1 at the 1996 Atlanta Paralympics. He teamed with Spencer Cotie and Jamieson Leeson in the Mixed Pairs BC3, where they won 2 and lost 2 matches but failed to qualify for the quarter-finals.

Michel won the two gold medals at the 2022 World Championships in Rio de Janeiro - Men's BC3 and Mixed Pairs BC3. He defeated José Gonçalves 5–1 in the final of the Men's BC3.

His ramp assistant is Ashlee McClure.

References

External links

Boccia Australia Athlete Profile

1995 births
Living people
Boccia players at the 2016 Summer Paralympics
Boccia players at the 2020 Summer Paralympics
Paralympic boccia players of Australia
Medalists at the 2020 Summer Paralympics
Paralympic bronze medalists for Australia
People with muscular dystrophy